The 2012 United States presidential election in Arizona took place on November 6, 2012, as part of the 2012 United States presidential election in which all 50 states plus the District of Columbia participated. State voters chose 10 electors to represent them in the Electoral College via a popular vote pitting incumbent Democratic President Barack Obama and his running mate, Vice President Joe Biden, against Republican challenger and former Massachusetts Governor Mitt Romney and his running mate, Congressman Paul Ryan. Prior to the election, all 17 news organizations considered this a state Romney would win, or otherwise considered as a safe red state. Arizona was won by Romney with a 9.03% margin. This is the most recent presidential election in which Arizona failed to back the national winner, and when the Democratic candidate won a presidential election without winning the state. Obama remains the only president to win two terms in office without carrying Arizona either time since the state's founding in 1912. Arizona is one of only two states that Obama lost in 2008 or 2012 that his vice president Joe Biden would go on to win in 2020, the other being Georgia.

Until 2020, Arizona had been won by the Republican nominee for president in every election since 1952, except when Bill Clinton narrowly carried the state over Bob Dole in 1996. No Democratic presidential nominee has won a majority in the state since Harry S. Truman in 1948, and the 2012 election remains the most recent presidential election in which any candidate won a majority of the vote. It also remains the most recent in which the state voted for the losing candidate.

Primaries

Democratic
Incumbent President Barack Obama won all the delegates.

Republican

The Republican primary was a closed primary that took place on February 28, 2012. More than 1,130,000 registered Republican voters participated in the event, the purpose of which was to select delegates from the state to attend the Republican National Convention on behalf of candidates for the Republican presidential nomination. The Republican National Committee removed half of Arizona's delegate allocation because the state committee moved its Republican primary before March 6. Arizona therefore held a ballot to select 29 proportionally-allocated delegates. This election occurred the same day as the Michigan Republican primary. The Arizona primary was set as a winner-take-all contest, another violation of RNC delegate allocation rules, which require proportional allocation for all primaries held before April 1. Endorsements from 2008 primary rival and U.S. Senator John McCain and Governor Jan Brewer helped add to the prospects of a victory for Romney in Arizona.

Polling

Project White House
The small alternative newspaper Tucson Weekly, for the second election in a row, has sponsored an event called "Project White House" in which it gets as many ordinary citizens on the ballot as it possibly can. Afterward, a series of "reality show style" competitions occurred, including candidate meet-and-greets, and two televised debates which were sponsored by the Tucson Weekly, a local public-access television show called Illegal Knowledge, and local public television stations.

The two debates took place on February 18 and February 19, 2012, both were commercial-free, one hour long each, and both aired on Access Tucson while they were streamed live on the internet. Both debates were produced in conjunction with Project White House and Jim Nintzel of the Tucson Weekly.

The first debate, held on the 18th at 8 pm MST, produced by Illegal Knowledge and hosted by Dave Maass of San Diego CityBeat, had nine participants, composed of eight lesser known Republican candidates (Donald Benjamin, Simon Bollander, Cesar Cisneros, Kip Dean, Sarah Gonzales, Al "Dick" Perry, Charles Skelley and Jim Terr) and one Green Party candidate (Michael Oatman). A press release regarding this first debate was distributed which invited all candidates listed on either Republican or Green Party ballots in Arizona to the first debate, although none of the major Republican or Green Party candidates appeared.

The second debate, held on the 19th at 7pm MST, produced by Access Tucson and hosted by both Dave Maass of San Diego CityBeat and Amanda Hurley of The University of Arizona School of Journalism, was restricted only to Republican candidates and featured seven of the eight lesser known Republican candidates from the previous night (less Cesar Cisneros).

There was a third Arizona debate which took place in Mesa, AZ on February 22, 2012, but was not associated with Project White House and had only invited the four major Republican candidates to participate.

Two lesser known candidates appearing in the first debates, Sarah Gonzales (who placed sixth) and Michael Oatman (who placed tied for third), placed ahead of their better known Republican and Green Party counterparts (Buddy Roemer and Gerard Davis respectively) in the Arizona Presidential Preference Election Results from February 28, 2012.

Campaign
Former Massachusetts Governor Mitt Romney, Texas Congressman Ron Paul, Former Louisiana Governor Buddy Roemer, Former Speaker of the House Newt Gingrich, and Former Pennsylvania Senator Rick Santorum were contesting and campaigning in the Arizona primary.

Televised debates in Arizona were held on February 18 and 19, 2012, on Public-access television and February 22, 2012, on CNN. Only the major Republican candidates, except for Roemer, were invited to the third, and none of them attended the first two.

Twenty-three candidates appeared on the presidential primary ballot, 11 of whom are residents of the state.

Results

Arizona was allocated 29 delegates because it moved its primary to February 28.

Voter turnout = 45.3%

General election

Ballot access
 Mitt Romney/Paul Ryan, Republican
 Barack Obama/Joseph Biden, Democratic
 Gary Johnson/James P. Gray, Libertarian
 Jill Stein/Cheri Honkala, Green
Write-in candidate access:
 Virgil Goode/Jim Clymer, Constitution
 Rocky Anderson/Luis J. Rodriguez, Justice

Results

By county

Source:

Results by congressional districts
Romney won 6 of 9 districts, including two that elected Democrats.

See also
 2012 Republican Party presidential debates and forums
 2012 Republican Party presidential primaries
 Results of the 2012 Republican Party presidential primaries
 Arizona Republican Party

References

External links
 
 The Green Papers: for Arizona
 The Green Papers: Major state elections in chronological order.

United States President
Arizona
2012